Ashes of Embers is a lost 1916 American silent drama film directed by Joseph Kaufman and Edward José. It was produced by Famous Players Film Company and distributed by Paramount Pictures. Pauline Frederick is the star of the picture. She plays two characters who are possibly twin sisters.

Cast
Pauline Frederick as Laura Ward / Agnes Ward
Earle Foxe as Richard Leigh
Frank Losee as William Benedict
J. Herbert Frank as Daniel Marvin
Maggie Halloway Fisher as Mrs. Ward
Jay Wilson as Detective

References

External links

1916 films
American silent feature films
Lost American films
Films directed by Edward José
Paramount Pictures films
Films directed by Joseph Kaufman
Silent American drama films
1916 drama films
American black-and-white films
1916 lost films
1910s American films